This is a list of the  squads for the 2019–20 World Rugby Women's Sevens Series.

Captains for a tournament have their jersey number marked in bold.

Australia 
Head coach: John Manenti

Brazil 
Head coach: Reuben Samuel (NZ)

Canada 
Head coach: John Tait

England 
Head coach: Charlie Hayter

Fiji 
Head coach: Saiasi Fuli

France 
Head coach: David Courteix

Ireland 
Head coach: Stan McDowell

New Zealand 
Head coaches: Allan Bunting and Cory Sweeney

Russia 
Head coach: Andrey Kuzin

Spain 
Head coach: Pedro de Matías

United States 
Head cach: Chris Brown

Invitational teams

China  
Coach: Sean Horan  (NZ)

Japan  
Coach: Hitoshi Inada

South Africa  
Coach: 	Paul Delport

References

!
World Rugby Women's Sevens Series squads